FK Dorćol is a defunct football club based in Dorćol, Belgrade, Serbia.

History
Founded in 1952, the club won the Serbian League Belgrade in the 2001–02 season and took promotion to the Second League of FR Yugoslavia for the first time in history. They placed ninth in Group North and immediately suffered relegation back to the third tier. In 2017, the club merged with local rivals GSP Polet to form GSP Polet Dorćol.

Honours
Serbian League Belgrade (Tier 3)
 2001–02

Notable players
For a list of all FK Dorćol players with a Wikipedia article, see :Category:FK Dorćol players.

Managerial history

References

External links
 Club page at Srbijasport
 Club page at Srbijafudbal

1952 establishments in Serbia
2017 disestablishments in Serbia
Association football clubs disestablished in 2017
Association football clubs established in 1952
Defunct football clubs in Serbia
Football clubs in Belgrade
Stari Grad, Belgrade